Suspicious Partner is a 2017 South Korean television series starring Ji Chang-wook and Nam Ji-hyun, with Choi Tae-joon and Kwon Nara. It aired on SBS from May 10 to July 13, 2017, at 22:00 (KST) on Wednesdays and Thursdays for 40 episodes.

The show enjoyed modest viewership share, but it beat its competitor by topping the important 20-49 year old demographic, as well as streaming, popularity, and brand reputation charts for consecutive weeks.

Synopsis
The series is about Noh Ji-wook (Ji Chang-wook), a prosecutor, and Eun Bong-hee (Nam Ji-hyun), a prosecutor trainee, and how they work together on a mysterious case involving a sly psychopath murderer. They find out how deeply connected they are by their past. A forgetful killer can be a dangerous thing. Noh Ji-wook is a prosecutor who changes jobs to become a private attorney due to circumstances. Eun Bong-hee is a prosecutor trainee under Ji-wook while he was a prosecutor. Attorney Ji Eun-hyuk (Choi Tae-joon) is a longtime family friend of Ji-wook who betrayed Ji-wook by cheating with Ji-wook's ex-girlfriend.

When a murderer strikes, Bong-hee suddenly finds herself as a suspect.

Cast

Main
 Ji Chang-wook as Noh Ji-wook 
Son Sang-yeon as young Ji-wook
A prosecutor in the Sunho District Prosecutors' Office who ends up switching professions to a private attorney in the aftermath of defending Eun Bong-hee, a defendant in which he was supposed to be her opponent. He harbors a trauma stemming from an event in his childhood involving his parents and first love. Bong-hee falls for him though he does not initially return the feelings. He comes to realize his feelings for her eventually and tries to win her over again. However, he started to be swayed again by the fact that Bong-hee's father could have been the arsonist who set the fire in which his parents died.
 Nam Ji-hyun as Eun Bong-hee
Choi Myung-bin as young Bong-hee
A prosecutor trainee at Ji-wook's office, later lawyer who was a Taekwondo athlete in her youth. One day, she suddenly becomes a murder suspect as her ex-boyfriend's dead body was found in her house in which she had no alibi, causing Jang Moo-young to keep coming after her and blames her for his son's death. She eventually falls for Ji-wook after he defended her. He eventually pursues her as he realizes his feelings for her but she is skeptical to accept his feelings as she was initially rejected by him.
 Choi Tae-joon as Ji Eun-hyuk
Kwon Bin as young Eun-hyuk
A lawyer with complicated family relationships who had particularly harsh adolescence. Once best friends with Ji-wook, he is now despised by him but tries his best to get back to being best friends with Ji-wook. He has a friendly platonic relationship with Bong-hee in which the two support each other with each others' romantic relationships.
 Kwon Nara as Cha Yoo-jung
Noh Ji-wook's ex-girlfriend who made an unforgettable mistake, a prosecutor who tries to win him back no matter what it takes. She harbours romantic feelings for Eun-hyuk which she confuses for friendship. She later becomes friends with Bong-hee and Na Ji-hae.

Supporting

People around Noh Ji-wook

 Lee Deok-hwa as Byun Young-hee
Ji-wook's adoptive father. The representative of a big law firm who later joins Ji-wook's newly opened firm. 
 Nam Gi-ae as Hong Bok-ja
Ji-wook's adoptive mom. She is a good friend of Ji-wook's real mom and owns a pizza shop. She is also the archenemy of Bong-hee's mother.
 Jo Seung-yeon as Noh Young-suk
Ji-wook's late father who was also a prosecutor.
 Jang Hyuk-jin as Bang Eun-ho
Ji-wook's prosecutor-turned-lawyer's right-hand man. He considers himself to be the 'mother' of the group.

People around Eun Bong-hee

 Yoon Bok-in as Park Young-soon 
Bong-hee's mother who loves her daughter. She works at a massage parlor where she befriends Ji-wook's mom and later ends up working for Ji-wook's mom. The two are frequently indulged in friendly banter.
 Lee Do-yeop as Bong Hee-boo
Bong-hee's father who died while trying to save Ji-wook. He was earlier accused of murdering Ji-wook's parents until it was discovered that he was innocent.
 Hwang Chan-sung as Jang Hee-joon 
Bong-hee's cheating ex-boyfriend. He died in Bong-hee's house which pointed her as the prime suspect.

People at the Training Center

 Kim Ye-won as Na Ji-hae
Bong-hee's classmate and rival. She later becomes a prosecutor and eventually Bong-hee's friend.
 Heo Joon-seok as Woo Hee-kyu
 Shim Eun-woo as Hong Cha-eun

Extended

 Dong Ha as Jung Hyun-soo
A victim who was accused of murder which has similar vibe to Bong-hee's case, but has a mysterious identity that lies in him. He was in fact a serial killer who had earlier, out of revenge, murdered five of the six gang-rapists (including the victim of a murder he was accused of and first appeared in the show for) of his high school crush Park So-young, who committed suicide after this incident. He was also the real culprit who murdered Jang Hee-joon; in fact, his real target was Bong-hee, who unknowingly witnessed him killing two of the rapists but ended up killing Hee-joon, who was at the wrong place at the wrong time when he tried to make amends with Bong-hee for cheating her. Hyun-soo was eventually sentenced to life imprisonment for the murders he committed. 
 Kim Hong-fa as Jang Moo-young
Jang Hee-joon's father and the District Attorney of Sunho District. He believes in upholding the might of the prosecution even if it meant defaming common people, as shown when he falsely incriminated Bong-hee's father as the arsonist who caused the fire that killed Ji-wook's parents and also himself, releasing the gang-rapists of Park So-young after dismissing their rape charges on the bribery of the parents and forcing Ji-wook to indict and convict Bong-hee (who was actually innocent) for murdering his son. Upon discovering Hyun-soo's guilt of his son's murder, he tried to kill him unsuccessfully and this led to his downfall as he was dismissed from his post and arrested for attempted murder (and possibly his pre-existing corruption prior to his arrest).
 Jin Ju-hyung as Go Chan-ho
A forensic investigator who went missing after being falsely incriminated for murder. He was actually one of the gang-rapists who raped Park So-young and was shown to be plagued with remorse (possibly) for the crime. He disappeared before he could meet up with Ji-wook to reveal something related to Hyun-soo, and was confirmed to be murdered by Hyun-soo when his body was discovered nearing the finale of the series. Four of his five accomplices - Lee Jae-ho, Yang Jin-woo, Kim Min-goo and Sung Jae-hyun - were earlier murdered by Hyun-soo while the final accomplice Min Young-hoon eventually surrendered and went to jail for the crime around the same time Hyun-soo was indicted the second time and finally sentenced.
 Park Gyu-young as Park So-young
A girl from Jung Hyun-soo's past who committed suicide after a tragedy which traumatized her.
 Park Ji-a as Park Seong-eun	
 Kim Kyung-jin as The guy who disturbed Bong-hee while drinking (Ep. 1)
 Jung Yeon
 Choi Hong-il as Vice-chief of Prosecutor (Ep. 1–4)
 Kim Ki-nam as Prosecutor who works with Jung Moo-young (Ep. 8)
 Seo Jin-wook as Forensic expert who testified in court (Ep. 4)
 Jo Won-hee as Judge
 Choi Ji-hoo
 Lee Da-jin

Special appearances

 Jang Won-young as Ji Ha-cheol, pervert (Ep. 1–2, 21)
 Hong Seok-cheon as Monk (Ep. 3)
 Park Sung-geun as Flasher (Ep. 4)
 Jo Jung-sik as News Anchor
 Lee Shi-ah as Lee Na-eun, stalking victim (Ep. 6)
 Ji Il-joo as Jeon Sung-ho, stalker (Ep. 6)
 Seo Dong-won as So Jung-ha (Ep. 21–22)
 Jo Ah-ra as So Jung-ha's girlfriend (Ep. 22)
 Kim Ye-jun as Kim Jae-hong (Ep. 32–33)

Production
The early working titles for the drama were Beware This Woman and Suspicious Romance. The first script reading took place April 4, 2017 at SBS Ilsan Production Center in Tanhyun, South Korea.

Both lead actors Ji Chang-wook and Nam Ji-hyun starred in Warrior Baek Dong-soo in 2011.

Original soundtrack

Part 1

Part 2

Part 3

Part 4

Part 5

Part 6

Part 7

Part 8

Part 9

Part 10

Chart performance

Ratings

Awards and nominations

Notes

References

External links
  
 
 

Seoul Broadcasting System television dramas
South Korean romantic comedy television series
South Korean thriller television series
2017 South Korean television series debuts
Korean-language television shows
2017 South Korean television series endings
Television series by Studio S